The Rochdale Pioneers Museum is housed in the building where the Rochdale Equitable Pioneers Society started trading on 21 December 1844. The museum is regarded as the birthplace of the modern co-operative movement. It is located in Rochdale, Greater Manchester, England.

The museum includes a recreation of the original shop, containing its rudimentary furniture, scales, items that were sold at the store, etc. Moreover, the museum transmits the influence of the co-operative movement on issues such as women's rights, poverty, education, fair trade and social reform. The museum is owned by the Co-operative Heritage Trust and managed by the Co-operative College.

History

The building
31 Toad Lane was originally an 18th-century warehouse, on a busy road which then extended to the centre of the town. In 1844 the Co-operative Society rented the ground floor, the upper floors being used by the Methodist society. A counter was made with a plank on barrels, and the shop began. From 1849 the Co-op rented the whole building and developed a library, meeting room, and boot and shoe department. In the 1860s other buildings were rented and in 1867 the society moved out to new purpose-built premises. The building became a pet shop.

The museum
The Rochdale Pioneers quickly became an inspiration for a wide part of the society, and the co-operative movement started to be known nationally and internationally. As a result, the Co-operative Union purchased the building at 31 Toad Lane in 1925, expressly to create a museum that enhanced the birthplace of co-operation. The museum opened for the first time in 1931.

In the 1970s, the museum was closed for some years because structural problems were found in the building; but it was successfully restored. Rochdale Council redeveloped the remaining section of Toad Lane outside of the building, which had been a cul-de-sac since the 1960s. The new characteristics of the area were cobbled streets, flanked by 19th-century gas lamps and a unique Victorian post-box. The official reopening was in 1981 and this commemorative ceremony was attended by Princess Alexandra.

In 2000, the management of the Rochdale Pioneers Museum was transferred to the Co-operative College, and it became recognised as a registered museum in 2001. In 2010 it received a £1.3M Heritage Lottery Fund award, and re-opened in 2012 after a £2.3M revamp, which included an extension with additional rooms as well as restoration of the third floor, and improvements to the displays.

The museum exhibition 

The museum provides an insight into the co-operative movement from its roots in Rochdale, to the circumstances that brought about the Rochdale Society of Equitable Pioneers and to the subsequent social impact and growth of the domestic and international co-operative movement. The museum also wants to highlight importance of the personalities who have had a significant impact on the movement.

The main themes of the museum are:
the development of the early co-operative movement
the Rochdale Principles
inspirational co-operators
history of retail
the growth of the movement, and its 20th-century social history
international co-operation

See also

Listed buildings in Rochdale
The Rochdale Pioneers (2012 film)

References

External links
 Official website

Further reading

History museums in Greater Manchester
History of Rochdale
Food museums in the United Kingdom
Former shops in England
Tourist attractions in the Metropolitan Borough of Rochdale
Buildings and structures in Rochdale
Cooperative movement
Co-operatives in England